Julesburg may refer to:
 Julesburg, Colorado, United States
 Julesburg, Missouri, United States
 Julesburg, Limpopo, South Africa